The Society of Biblical Literature (SBL), founded in 1880 as the Society of Biblical Literature and Exegesis, is an American-based learned society dedicated to the academic study of the Bible and related ancient literature. Its current stated mission is to "foster biblical scholarship". Membership is open to the public and consists of over 8,300 individuals from over 100 countries. As a scholarly organization, SBL has been a constituent society of the American Council of Learned Societies since 1929.

History 
Calvin Stowe, husband of novelist Harriet Beecher Stowe, was in the 1830's Professor of Biblical Literature at the innovative Lane Seminary, at the time one of the nation's leading seminaries. 

The eight founders of the Society of Biblical Literature and Exegesis first met to discuss their new society in Philip Schaff's study in New York City in January 1880. In June the group had their first Annual Meeting with eighteen people in attendance. The new society drew up a constitution and by-laws and discussed several papers. Membership dues were set at three dollars. By the end of the year, membership had grown to forty-five and publication of the meeting proceedings were in the planning stages. The Journal of Biblical Literature (JBL) was launched the following year.
The SBL was not the first association dedicated to biblical studies in North America, but it was the first that was interdenominational. The thirty-two founding members of SBL in 1880 even included a Unitarian, Ezra Abbott. The society's development was contemporary with increasing interest in Ancient Near East studies.

The society shortened its name to Society of Biblical Literature in 1962.

Publications 
The Society of Biblical Literature has published the flagship Journal of Biblical Literature since 1881. In addition it publishes the journal Review of Biblical Literature. It publishes literature under the imprint SBL Press".

The SBL Handbook of Style is a style manual specifically for the field of ancient Near Eastern, biblical, and early Christian studies. The SBL Handbook of Style includes a recommended standard format for abbreviation of primary sources in Ancient Near Eastern, biblical, and early Christian studies. The Chicago Manual of Style (16th ed.) refers writers to The SBL Handbook "for authoritative guidance". The "Student Supplement" is downloadable, and also contain recommendations for transliteration standards.

In 2011 the society was awarded a $300,000 grant from the National Endowment for the Humanities to produce Bible Odyssey, "an interactive website that brings nonsectarian biblical scholarship to the general public".

In 2016, the Society of Biblical Literature published a jobs report in conjunction with the American Academy of Religion that provided employment data from the 2014–15 academic year.

Annual meeting 
One of the most important functions of the Society of Biblical Literature, is hosting the Annual Meeting. The Annual Meeting is hosted in the United States and attended by the majority of SBL membership. The meeting includes presentation of research, voting on business matters of the society, workshops & seminars, a vendor floor and more. The Meeting consists of "more than 1,200 academic sessions, and workshops, along with one of the world's largest exhibits of books and digital resources for biblical studies, the Annual Meetings is one of the largest events of the year in the fields of biblical scholarship, religious studies and theology."

Regional and international meetings 
In addition to the annual meeting, multiple regional and an international meeting are held each year. Regional meetings consist of scholars in a geographic area within North America who promote biblical scholarship on a local level. Each region is coordinated by a scholar within the region and regions promote "Regional Scholars", to recognize outstanding scholars in the area.   Society of Biblical Literature regions include: Central States, Eastern Great Lakes, Mid Atlantic, Midwest, New England & Eastern Canada, Pacific Coast, Pacific Northwest, Rocky Mountains & Great Plains, Southeastern, Southwestern and Upper Midwest.

The International Meeting is held annually in a location outside of North America specifically for scholars located out of the region.

Presidents 

 1880–1887 Daniel Raynes Goodwin
 1887–1889 Frederic Gardiner
 1889–1890 Francis Brown
 1890–1891 Charles A. Briggs
 1891–1894 Talbot W. Chambers
 1894–1895 J. Henry Thayer
 1895–1896 Francis Brown
 1896–1897 Edward T. Bartlett
 1898–1899 George F. Moore
 1900 John P. Peters
 1901 Edward Y. Hincks
 1902 Benjamin W. Bacon
 1903 Richard J. H. Gottheil
 1904 Willis J. Beecher
 1905 William Rainey Harper
 1906 Paul Haupt
 1907 James Hardy Ropes
 1908 Frank Chamberlain Porter
 1909 Henry Preserved Smith
 1910 David G. Lyon
 1911 Ernest de Witt Burton
 1912 Lewis B. Paton
 1913 George A. Barton
 1914 Nathaniel Schmidt
 1915 Charles Cutler Torrey
 1916 Morris Jastrow Jr.
 1917 Warren J. Moulton
 1918 James A. Montgomery
 1919 Edgar J. Goodspeed
 1920 Albert T. Clay
 1921 Kemper Fullerton
 1922 William R. Arnold
 1923 Max L. Margolis
 1924 Clayton R. Bowen
 1925 Julius A. Bewer
 1926 Shirley Jackson Case
 1927 Irving F. Wood
 1928 Loring Woart Batten
 1929 James E. Frame
 1930 William Frederic Badè
 1931 Burton Scott Easton
 1932 J. M. Powis Smith
 1933 James Moffatt
 1934 Frederick C. Grant
 1935 Elihu Grant
 1936 Henry J. Cadbury
 1937 George Dahl
 1938 William Henry Paine Hatch
 1939 W. F. Albright
 1940 Chester C. McCown
 1941 Julian Morgenstern
 1942–1943 Kirsopp Lake
 1944 Theophile James Meek
 1945 Morton Scott Enslin
 1946 Leroy Waterman
 1947 Ernest Cadman Colwell
 1948 John W. Flight
 1949 Floyd V. Filson
 1950 Robert H. Pfeiffer
 1951 Erwin R. Goodenough
 1952 Sheldon H. Blank
 1953 S. Vernon McCasland
 1954 Millar Burrows
 1955 Amos N. Wilder
 1956 J. Philip Hyatt
 1957 Sherman E. Johnson
 1958 William A. Irwin
 1959 Robert M. Grant
 1960 R. B. Y. Scott
 1961 Samuel Sandmel
 1962 Herbert G. May
 1963 John Knox
 1964 Fred V. Winnett
 1965 Kenneth W. Clark
 1966 John L. McKenzie
 1967 Paul Schubert
 1968 James Muilenburg
 1969 Frank W. Beare
 1970 Harry M. Orlinsky
 1971 Bruce M. Metzger
 1972 Walter J. Harrelson
 1973 Norman Perrin
 1974 Frank Moore Cross
 1975 Robert W. Funk
 1976 David Noel Freedman
 1977 Raymond E. Brown
 1978 James A. Sanders
 1979 Joseph A. Fitzmyer
 1980 Bernhard Anderson
 1981 James M. Robinson
 1982 Lou H. Silberman
 1983 Krister Stendahl
 1984 Roland E. Murphy
 1985 Wayne A. Meeks
 1986 James L. Mays
 1987 Elisabeth Schüssler Fiorenza
 1988 Philip J. King
 1989 Paul J. Achtemeier
 1990 Walter Brueggemann
 1991 Helmut Koester
 1992 Norman K. Gottwald
 1993 Victor P. Furnish
 1994 Phyllis Trible
 1995 Leander E. Keck
 1996 Gene M. Tucker
 1997 Hans Dieter Betz
 1998 Patrick D. Miller
 1999 D. Moody Smith
 2000 Adele Berlin
 2001 Harold W. Attridge
 2002 John J. Collins
 2003 Eldon Jay Epp
 2004 David L. Petersen
 2005 Carolyn Osiek
 2006 Robert Kraft
 2007 Katharine Doob Sakenfeld
 2008 Jonathan Z. Smith
 2009 David J. A. Clines
 2010 Vincent L. Wimbush
 2011 Carol Newsom
 2012 John Dominic Crossan
 2013 Carol Meyers
 2014 Fernando Segovia
 2015 Athalya Brenner-Idan
 2016 Beverly Gaventa
 2017 Michael V. Fox
 2018 Brian K. Blount
 2019 Gale A. Yee
 2020 Adele Reinhartz

Administrative officers 
Secretary
 1880–1883 Frederic Gardiner
 1883–1889 Hinckley G. Mitchell

Recording Secretary
 1889–1890 Charles Rufus Brown
 1890–1915 William H. Cobb
 1916–1933 Henry J. Cadbury
 1934–1946 John W. Flight
 1947–1950 Kenneth W. Clark
 1951–1952 Louise Pettibone Smith
 1953–1961 Charles F. Kraft
 1961  (pro tempore)
 1962–1963 Kendrick Grobel

Executive Secretary
 1964–1965 Kendrick Grobel
 1965 Richard T. Mead (pro tempore)
 1966 Lawrence E. Toombs
 1967 Walter J. Harrelson
 1968–1974 Robert W. Funk
 1975–1976 George W. MacRae
 1977–1980 Paul J. Achtemeier
 1981–1987 Kent Harold Richards

Executive Director
 1987–1995 David Lull
 1995–2010 Kent Harold Richards
 2010–present John F. Kutsko

References

Footnotes

Bibliography

External links 
 
 "Society of Biblical Literature" in the American Council of Learned Societies directory. Updated September 15, 2008.

Ancient Near East organizations
Biblical exegesis
Biblical studies organizations
Member organizations of the American Council of Learned Societies
Organizations established in 1880